Cazenga is an city and the most densely populated of the nine municipalities that make up the province of Luanda, Angola. It has a population of 892,401 (2014 census), with an estimated 1,045,722 in 2019, covering an area of 37 km2.

Administrative divisions 
The municipality of Cazenga is made up of three communes:
 Cazenga
 Tala Hady
 Hoji Ya Henda

Transportation 
Cazenga is the site of the workshops for the Luanda Railway.

Utilities 
In a 1974 article  American political scientist Gerald J. Bender wrote: "Another account of the sale of water to Africans can be found in the Luandan newspaper, Província de Angola. The article reported that water is sold in the slum of Cazenga at an average price of 2.5 escudos (about ten American cents) for five gallons. (The legal minimum daily wage for the district of Luanda in July 1974 was 25 escudos - about one American dollar-per day.)

See also 
 Railway stations in Angola

References 

Municipalities in Luanda
Populated places in Luanda Province
Slums in Africa